A porte chiuse (internationally released as Behind Closed Doors) is a 1961 Italian comedy film directed by Dino Risi.

Cast 
 Anita Ekberg: Olga Duvovich
 Fred Clark: Xatis Attorney General
 Ettore Manni: sailor
 Claudio Gora: President of the Court
 Gianni Bonagura:  defense lawyer
 Alberto Talegalli: Poseydon, head of jury
 Mario Scaccia: Manning 
 Hélène Rémy: Marietta 
 Béatrice Altariba : the bride
 Vittorio Caprioli: commissioner

References

External links
 

1961 films
Films directed by Dino Risi
Films scored by Piero Umiliani
Commedia all'italiana
1961 comedy films
1960s Italian films